Lost River is an unincorporated community on the Lost River in eastern Hardy County, West Virginia, United States. Lost River lies along West Virginia Route 259.

Historic site
 Lost River General Store, WV 259; listed on the National Register of Historic Places in 2005.

Points of interest
 Lost River State Park

Notable people
 James Ward Wood, born near Lost River, Founder of Kappa Alpha Order.

References

Unincorporated communities in Hardy County, West Virginia
Unincorporated communities in West Virginia